Franco Girolami (born February 14, 1992 in Isla Verde, Córdoba Province) is an Argentine motor racing driver. He won Formula Renault Plus, TC2000, Top Race V6 and TCR Europe Touring Car Series championships.

Franco is the brother of the WTCR driver Néstor Girolami.

Racing career 
Franco started his sports career in 2008, focusing on the next years in open-wheel championships. In 2011 he won the Formula Renault Plus championship and was runner-up in Formula Renault Argentina. In the next year, he was TC2000 champion with six wins in 10 races.

In 2013 he made his debut in Súper TC2000 with the Chevrolet Argentina factory team and the next year in Top Race V6.

Franco returned to being a full-time Súper TC2000 driver only in 2020 with Fiat Racing Team. Between 2015 and 2019 he raced with Gabriel Furlán's team in TRV6, with Mitsubishi cars. He won the title in 2018 with three wins and one point ahead of seven-time champion Agustín Canapino. Third was his brother Néstor. In 2019 he won five races and was second in the championship, behind Matías Rossi, while in 2020 he won two races and finished third.

His first race in a championship outside of Argentina was in 2018, in Stock Car Brasil, invited by Denis Navarro. In 2020 he participated in rounds of TCR Italy and TCR Europe championships. He wins the first race of 2021 TCR Italy at Misano after starting in pole position. Weeks later, he also achieved his first victory in TCR Europe, at Zandvoort, and is the championship leader. Won for the second time at Monza, but lost the championship to Mikel Azcona.

In 2022, Girolami claimed the TCR Europe title in his first season with Audi Sport Team Comtoyou PSS.He had four wins and podiums at all rounds, outscoring runner-up Tom Coronel by more than 100 points.

Racing record

Racing career summary

Complete TCR Europe Touring Car Series results
(key) (Races in bold indicate pole position) (Races in italics indicate fastest lap)

† Driver did not finish, but was classified as he completed over 75% of the race distance.

Complete World Touring Car Cup results
(key) (Races in bold indicate pole position) (Races in italics indicate fastest lap)

‡ As Girolami was a Wildcard entry, he was ineligible to score points.

References

External links 
 
 

1992 births
Argentine racing drivers
TC 2000 Championship drivers
Racing drivers from Buenos Aires
Living people
Top Race V6 drivers
Stock Car Brasil drivers
Formula Renault Argentina drivers
Súper TC 2000 drivers
World Touring Car Cup drivers
Comtoyou Racing drivers
TCR Europe Touring Car Series drivers